Ruti is a 1996 Bangladeshi film. The film is directed by Nadeem Mahmud and produced by Enayet Karim. Manna, Shahnaz, Prabir Mitra and Wasimul Bari Rajib plays the lead roles.The film became a box-office success following its release.

Cast

Manna
Shahnaz
Wasimul Bari Rajib
Dildar
Prabir Mitra
Khaleda Aktar Kalpana
Nasreen
Nishi

Music
Shawkat Ali Emon composed the songs while Kabir Bakul and Enayet Karim penned the lyrics.
"Amar Moner Tala Tui Khule De" - Runa Laila, Khalid Hasan Milu

References

External links
Roti Film at Bangladesh Film Archive

1998 films
1990s Bengali-language films
Bengali-language Bangladeshi films
Films scored by Shawkat Ali Emon